Solar Radio is a London-based radio station, which originally started life as a pirate radio station. Solar broadcasts primarily soul to London on DAB and online. 

Solar (originally short for Sound of Londons Alternative Radio) first broadcast as a pirate radio station on 4 November 1984, and was founded by DJs Clive Richardson and Tony Monson, the latter whom joined Kiss FM. Solar ceased broadcasting in October 1988 as an unlicensed operator.

On 1 June 1999, Solar returned through satellite broadcasting, initially broadcasting on Astra 19.2°E, and then Astra 2 (used by Sky TV) from 9 August 2000 where they stayed until 31 May 2019. From 29 October 2015, Solar also commenced broadcasting on the Trial London DAB MUX. 

Presenters on Solar include Tony Monson, Lisa I'Anson, Ralph Tee, Louie Martin, Kid Batchelor, and Steve Johns. Robbie Vincent has occasionally guested on the station.

References

External links 

Radio stations in London
Former pirate radio stations
Pirate radio stations in the United Kingdom
Radio stations established in 1984